Kolić (Serbian Cyrillic: Колић) is a Serbo-Croatian surname. Notable people with the surname include:

Darko Kolić (born 1971), Serbian football player
Larry Kolic, American football player
Refik Kolić (born 1965), Bosnian folk music singer

See also 
Koliq

Serbian surnames